Alexey Gamen (18 May 1773, Gzhatsk, Smolensk province - 1829) -  was a Russian lieutenant general and commander of the Napoleonic Wars. He was from a noble family (his father was a court physician to Catherine II of Russia) whose ancestors had immigrated to Russia in the 17th century.

External links 
http://www.museum.ru/museum/1812/Persons/slovar/sl_g02.html

Russian commanders of the Napoleonic Wars
1773 births
1829 deaths